Metropolitan African Methodist Episcopal Church ("Metropolitan AME Church") is a historic church located at 1518 M Street, N.W., in downtown Washington, D.C. It affiliates with the African Methodist Episcopal Church.

History 
The congregation was founded in 1838 as Union Bethel (Metropolitan) A. M. E. Church. In 1880, John W. Stevenson was appointed by Bishop Daniel Payne to be pastor of the church for the purpose of building a new church, which would become Metropolitan African Methodist Episcopal Church. The cornerstone was laid in September, 1881. However, Stevenson's methods were upsetting to some of his congregation, and Stevenson was removed before the building was finished after asking for a salary that was deemed too high. The new building was dedicated on May 30, 1886 and was constructed by architect George Dearing. According to the church, it is the oldest continuously black-owned property in the original 10-mile-square parcel of the District. The funerals of abolitionist Frederick Douglass (1895) and civil-rights activist Rosa Parks (2005) were held in the church. The building was added to the National Register of Historic Places in 1973. In May 2010, the National Trust for Historic Preservation added the building to its list of 11 of America's Most Endangered Places due to water damage and other structural problems requiring $11 million in renovations.

President Barack Obama attended services here on Sunday, January 20, 2013, before his second inauguration.

A Black Lives Matter banner was stolen from the church and burned during a pro-Trump march on December 12, 2020. Proud Boys leader Enrique Tarrio was later arrested by Washington, D.C. police and charged with one count of destruction of property, a misdemeanor offense. On January 4, 2021, the church filed a lawsuit against both 
Proud Boys International, LLC, and Tarrio; neither responded and the church is now seeking default judgment against both.

See also
 National Register of Historic Places listings in the District of Columbia

References

External links

 
 
 

Churches completed in 1886
19th-century Methodist church buildings in the United States
African-American history of Washington, D.C.
African Methodist Episcopal churches
Gothic Revival church buildings in Washington, D.C.
Churches on the National Register of Historic Places in Washington, D.C.
Religious organizations established in 1838
1838 establishments in the United States